The Stadacona Band of the Royal Canadian Navy is a Canadian military band in the Royal Canadian Navy based in Halifax. It serves as official military band of the Maritime Forces Atlantic Command (MARLANT). It is one of six regular force military bands in the Canadian Forces. It provides musical accompaniment for ceremonial requirements of the East Coast Navy. The Stadacona Band usually performs at the Halifax dockyard to take part in the welcoming naval vessels. For over 75 years, the band's performances have been seen members of the Royal Family, the Governor General of Canada, the Prime Minister of Canada, foreign heads of state, and Canadian naval officials. The band has provided music for all graduation activities in the area.

History
In the summer of 1942 the original
Stadacona band was divided into three parts, with one section going to HMCS
St. Hyacinthe, another to HMCS Cornwallis and the remainder to HMCS Avalon. In October of that year another military band was formed for the ship. In 1943, part of the Stadacona band went to serve as aboard HMCS Protector at Sydney, Nova Scotia. In 1967, the band was one of three naval bands represented in the 1967 Canadian Armed Forces Tattoo. The Stadacona band absorbed the Royal Canadian Artillery Band (Coastal) and members of the HMCS Cornwallis Band following the 1968 Unification of the Canadian Armed Forces.

In September 2017, a member of the band composed what is now the service march of the Canadian Coast Guard.

Directors of Music
Jim Forde (October 1987-July 1994)
Peter van der Horden (July 1994-May 2001)
Raymond Murray (January 2006-)
Patrice Arsenault (August 2016-August 2018)
Brad Ritson (August 2018 – Present)

Ensembles

 Ceremonial Band
 Concert Band
 Big Band
 Jazz/Dixie combos
 Brass ensemble
 Woodwind ensemble

A four-piece combo from the Stadacona Band toured Norway, Sweden, and Denmark in 1981.

Links
 Official Website
"Heart of Oak" (MP3) performed by the Stadacona Band

References

Bands of the Royal Canadian Navy
Musical groups established in 1940
1940 establishments in Canada